Museum of the American Arts and Crafts Movement (MAACM) is a  museum in St. Petersburg, Florida.  Designed by Alfonso Architects, the museum is five stories and features a grand atrium, skylights, a spiral staircase, more than 40,000 square feet of gallery space, a library, theater, graphic studio, and park. The Two Red Roses Foundation, endowed by art collector, businessman and philanthropist Rodolfo (Rudy) Ciccarello is funding the Museum, which will display the Foundation's collection of fine and decorative arts of the Arts and Crafts Movement period. The building is reported to cost at least $90 million.

History

The Foundation's collection was developed by Rudy Ciccarello. Ciccarello first intended to build the museum in cooperation with the city of Tampa on a site across from the Tampa Museum of Art at the edge of Curtis Hixon Park. That deal fell apart in 2012 when Ciccarello and the city were unable to agree on financial terms, and Ciccarello decided to construct the museum without government assistance.  Dewey Blanton of the American Alliance of Museums remarked on the rarity of museums on this scale being built in the United States "these days."

Ciccarello, who founded a successful pharmaceutical distribution business, says that he first became interested in the Arts and Crafts movement when he saw a cabinetmaker crafting a bookcase copied from one designed by Gustav Stickley, and decided to buy the original.  He has been collecting since the early 1990s, purchasing "pottery, metalwork, lighting, tile, built-ins such as fireplaces, even entire rooms, tiled walls and all," in addition to the furniture that first caught his eye.  More recently, he began to collect photographers of the early 20th century Pictorialist movement, and the Photo-Secession movement, including Alfred Stieglitz.

Kevin W. Tucker, the former Margot B. Perot Senior Curator of Decorative Arts and Design with the Dallas Museum of Art was appointed the inaugural Director of the MAACM in August 2015. Ciccarello dissolved the Director position in December 2015.

Collection

The collection includes work by Gustav Stickley, Charles Rohlfs, Frank Lloyd Wright, the artists of Byrdcliffe Colony, Greene and Greene, Dirk van Erp, Roycroft, William Grueby, Newcomb Pottery, and Arthur Wesley Dow.  Images and descriptions of some of the work to be displayed in the museum can be found on the website of the Two Red Roses Foundation.

Kent Lydecker, director of the Museum of Fine Arts (St. Petersburg, Florida), describes the Ciccarello collection as, "one of the most important collections of American Arts and Crafts, in all media, in private hands."

References

External links
 

Arts and Crafts movement
Art museums and galleries in Florida
Museums in St. Petersburg, Florida
Decorative arts museums in the United States